Pratylenchidae is a family of nematodes or roundworms. It contains the subfamily  Pratylenchinae, as well as the subfamilies Hirschmanniellinae, Radopholinae, and Nacobbinae. Pratylenchinae are plant parasites.

Sources 

Tylenchida
Protostome subfamilies